Jackson Township is one of fourteen townships in Dearborn County, Indiana. As of the 2010 census, its population was 1,705 and it contained 624 housing units.

History
Jackson Township was organized in 1832. It was originally a part of Kelso Township. The first settlement in this Township was made by Isaac Lawrence, Senior, who emigrated from Pennsylvania in the spring of 1818, and settled on the Northwest quarter of section 17. Mr. Lawrence brought with him eight sons and two daughters, who settled in the same neighborhood, each on a quarter section.

Prior to the change from Ohio to Indiana, both Isaac and his brother Volentine settled here with their families. Check property records dated April 27, 1818 #547 and #548. Volentine continued to purchase property over the next several years #365, 088, 386, 404, and 294. "Volentine Lawrence of Dearborne County Ohio having deposited in the General Land-Office a Certificate of the Register of the Land-Office at Cincinnati whereby it appears that full payment has been made for the South West Quarter of Section two, in township Seven of the Range two"

Geography

Unincorporated towns
 Hubbells Corner
 Lawrenceville
 Weisburg
(This list is based on USGS data and may include former settlements.)

Major highways
  Interstate 74
  Indiana State Road 46

References
 
 United States Census Bureau cartographic boundary files

External links
 Indiana Township Association
 United Township Association of Indiana

Townships in Dearborn County, Indiana
Townships in Indiana
1832 establishments in Indiana
Populated places established in 1832